The rue des Lombards is a street in Paris, France which is famous for hosting three of the main French jazz clubs: Le Baiser Salé, Le Duc des Lombards and the Sunset/Sunside. It was originally a banking center in medieval Paris, a trade dominated by Lombard merchants, name given from the 12th century onwards to Italian merchants and bankers. It was also shown on the Simpsons episode "To Courier with Love".

Lombards
Lombards